Timo Kahlen (born 1966 in Berlin) is a German sound sculptor and media artist who currently lives and works in Berlin.

Life and work

Timo Kahlen is known for his sound sculptures and site-specific sound art works, installations with steam, wind and light, as well as experimental net art, video and photography. His interdisciplinary and intermedia body of work, often employing ephemeral, elemental materials such as wind and steam, light and shade, sound and vibration, noise and beauty, has been nominated for the German national Sound Art Prize 2006, the Kahnweiler Prize for Sculpture 2001 and the Prize for Young European Photographers 1989, as well as various scholarships in Washington D.C., Berlin, Paris and Guernsey. Kahlen's work is involved with the sculptural and conceptual aspects of immaterial phenomena and processes, and curators as Joanna Littlejohns have emphasized the ephemeral, "temporary and changeable nature" of his concentrated oeuvre. Kahlen's work has been presented in more than 140 exhibitions and retrospectives of contemporary media art since the mid-1980s, including Sound Art: Sound as a Medium of the Arts (ZKM Center for Arts and Media Technologies, Karlsruhe 2012–2013), the Mediations Biennale (Poland 2012), Tonspur_expanded: The Loudspeaker (Vienna, 2010–11), Noise & Beauty (Berlin 2010), 60 × 60 (New York 2010), Manifesta 7: Scenarios (Italy 2008), Sound Art: German Sound Art Prize 2006 (Marl and Cologne 2006), Wireless Experience (Helsinki 2004), Zeitskulptur: Volumen als  Ereignis (Linz 1997) and the solo exhibition Timo Kahlen: Works with Wind (1991), inaugurating the Kunst-Werke in Berlin.

His installation at the Aviation Museum in Amberg in 2010 was disrupted when a cleaner mistakenly vacuumed up the two dead hornets he had placed on a loudspeaker: the installation was titled Tanz für Insekten (dance for insects) and the intention was for the dead insects to "dance" as a result of the vibrations. Rather than kill more hornets, he replaced them with dead houseflies.

Kahlen received his Master of Fine Arts degree from the Berlin University of the Arts, where he studied under Professor Dieter Appelt and held a lectureship in Visual Media and Video Art from 1993 to 1998.

Exhibitions (selection)

2013: Media Art Histories: Renew, International Conference, Riga / Latvia
2012: Sound Art: Sound as a Medium of the Arts, ZKM Center for Art and Media Technologies, Karlsruhe / Germany
2012: Mediations Biennale: The Unknown, Poznan / Poland
2012: Directors Lounge, Berlin / Germany
2011: Ruido de Fronteira: Eletronika Festival, Belo Horizonte / Brazil
2011: An Exchange with Sol LeWitt, MASS MoCA, Massachusetts / USA
2011: Luftkunst, Zeppelin Museum, Friedrichshafen / Germany
2010: Tonspur_expanded: The Loudspeaker, freiraum Quartier21, Vienna / Austria
2010: SIGHT.SOUND (INTERACTION) 5, Maryland Institute College of Art, Baltimore / USA
2009: naturasnaturans, Casello delle Polveri, Certosa, Venice / Italy
2008: MANIFESTA 7 Biennale, Fortezza / Italy
2007: Sonic Image: Totally Huge New Music Festival, Perth Institute of Contemporary Art, Perth / Australia
2007: Strictly Berlin, Berlin / Germany
2006: Sound Art: Deutscher Klangkunst-Preis 2006", Art Cologne, Cologne / Germany
2006: Timo Kahlen: Earcatcher, Ruine der Kuenste Berlin, Berlin / Germany
2006: Deutscher Klangkunst-Preis 2006, Skulpturenmuseum Glaskasten Marl / Germany
2006: 40jahrevideokunst.de – was fehlt?, Deutscher Kuenstlerbund, Berlin / Germany
2005: Media Dirt, Ruine der Kuenste Berlin, Berlin / Germany
2004: Wireless Experience, ISEA 2004 at Kiasma National Museum of Contemporary Art, Helsinki / Finland
2002: Zewidewit Zizidaeh, Galerie im Saalbau, Berlin /Germany
2001: Timo Kahlen, the gallery, International Artist in Residence Programme, Guernsey / GB
2001: Staubrauschen, Galerie Pankow, Berlin / Germany
2000: Licht. Zeit. Klang. Raum, Schwartzsche Villa, Berlin / Germany
2000: Liquid Light, Galerie im Parkhaus, Berlin / Germany
1997: Zeitskulptur: Volumen als Ereignis, Oberoesterreichische Landesgalerie, Linz / Austria
1997: Stroemung, Soma Projektgalerie, Berlin / Germany
1995: Stipendiaten der Karl-Hofer-Gesellschaft, Berlin / Germany
1995: Leerraum, Ruine der Kuenste Berlin, Berlin / Germany
1995: Lichtstaub, Galerie Voges + Deisen, Frankfurt am Main / Germany
1994: 3 Deutschland, DC Arts Center, Washington D.C. / USA
1994: Art(s) d'Europe: Emerging Artists in Europe Today, Goethe-Institut Paris / France
1993: Immaterialien, Galerie Voges + Deisen, Frankfurt am Main / Germany
1992: (ueber Zeit) am Bauhaus, Bauhaus Dessau / Germany
1992: Kunststudenten stellen aus, Bonner Kunstverein, Bonn / Germany
1992: Deutscher Kuenstlerbund, Ludwig Forum für Internationale Kunst, Aachen / Germany
1991: Die Ruine der Kuenste Berlin, Kunsthalle Palazzo, Basel / Switzerland
1991: Photography as Object, Galerie Ghislave, Paris / France
1991: Objekte in Originalgroeße, Hochschule der Künste Berlin, Berlin / Germany
1991: Timo Kahlen: Arbeiten mit Wind, KUNST-WERKE Berlin / Germany
1989: Prize for Young European Photographers, Frankfurter Kunstverein, Frankfurt am Main / Germany
1989: Timo Kahlen: Erste Arbeiten'', Ruine der Kuenste Berlin, Berlin / Germany

External links 
Timo Kahlen official website, contains documentation of sound sculptures and installations, of works with wind and steam, of experimental media and net art works such as audio dust, sounddrift, undo/delete und signal-to-noise
Collection of ZKM Center for Art and Media Technologies, Karlsruhe
Sound Art: Sound as a Medium of the Arts, 2012–13
Tonspur_expanded: The Loudspeaker, Wien (German)
SoundLAB interview with the artist
Mediations Biennale: the Unknown, Poznan 2012
Timo Kahlen, Noise & Beauty, Neural (magazine) for media art - hactivism - e-music, June 2012
Radius: Radio as Art, Episode # 17, Chicago / USA 2011
Media-Scape, Zagreb 2010
Strictly Berlin 2007
Ruine der Kuenste Berlin, private space for material and immaterial arts
Kunst-Werke Berlin
Art and Islands Foundation: International Artist in Residence Programme, Guernsey 2001
Review of Timo Kahlen's net art works, Julia Schmidt 2011 (German)
Air Museum (Luftmuseum) Amberg, Germany
Further documentation on website of VG Bild-Kunst, Germany
German Society for Abstract Photography
Archive of public sculptures, BBK Berlin
Members of the Deutscher Kuenstlerbund : German Artist Association
Visual Artbeat Magazine, Issue #5, November 2010
Catalog of Deutsche National-Bibliothek (German National Library)
Exhibitions of Timo Kahlen on artfacts.net

References

German sound artists
New media artists
German contemporary artists
1966 births
Living people